Bomachoge Chache is a constituency in Kenya.

It is one of nine constituencies in Kisii County.

Gucha Sub-county
Gucha Sub-county shares common boundaries with Bomachoge Chache Constituency. The Sub-county is headed by the sub-county administrator, appointed by a County Public Service Board.

References 

Constituencies in Kisii County